Michał Janota (born 29 July 1990 in Gubin) is a Polish professional footballer who plays as a winger for Podbeskidzie in the I liga.

Club career
Janota joined Feyenoord in 2006 from UKP Zielona Góra. He made his debut for Feyenoord on 23 August 2008, coming on as a substitute against PSV Eindhoven in the Dutch Super Cup. His first appearance in the Eredivisie came on 31 August as a substitution against Heracles Almelo. He got on the scoresheet for the first time on 24 September with a brace against TOP Oss in the KNVB Cup.

In July 2009, he joined Excelsior on loan in the Eerste Divisie. In June 2010, Janota left Feyenoord on a free transfer and signed a two-year contract with Eerste Divisie side Go Ahead Eagles, with an option for a third year. The team reached the 2010–11 promotion playoffs but dropped out in the first round.

On 18 June 2012 Janota signed a one-year contract with Polish Ekstraklasa side Korona Kielce, with an option for further two years.

In 2018, he signed for Arka Gdynia.

In December 2020, Janota joined Australian A-League club Central Coast Mariners as a foreign player.

In August 2021, Janota returned to Poland, signing a two-year contract with I liga club Podbeskidzie.

Club career statistics
(correct as of 14 June 2010)

References

External links
 
 Player profile on Polish SOCA!
 
 

1990 births
Living people
Polish footballers
Feyenoord players
Excelsior Rotterdam players
Go Ahead Eagles players
Korona Kielce players
Pogoń Szczecin players
Górnik Zabrze players
Podbeskidzie Bielsko-Biała players
Stal Mielec players
Arka Gdynia players
Al-Fateh SC players
Central Coast Mariners FC players
Eredivisie players
Eerste Divisie players
Ekstraklasa players
I liga players
Saudi Professional League players
Polish expatriate footballers
Expatriate footballers in the Netherlands
Expatriate footballers in Saudi Arabia
Expatriate soccer players in Australia
Polish expatriate sportspeople in the Netherlands
Polish expatriate sportspeople in Saudi Arabia
Polish expatriate sportspeople in Australia
People from Gubin, Poland
Sportspeople from Lubusz Voivodeship
Association football midfielders
Poland youth international footballers
Poland under-21 international footballers